Marks of the Church may refer to:

 Marks of the Church (Protestantism)
 Four Marks of the Church